Inherited Passions is a 1929 German silent drama film directed by Gustav Ucicky and starring Walter Rilla, Fritz Alberti, and Valerie Boothby.

Cast

References

Bibliography

External links

1929 films
Films of the Weimar Republic
Films directed by Gustav Ucicky
German silent feature films
German black-and-white films
German drama films
1929 drama films
Silent drama films
1920s German films